Margaret Noel Hood (25 December 1909 – 15 October 1979) was a British actress. She was married to the Irish-born actor Charles Oliver.

Filmography

Film
 Crook's Tour (1940) as Edith Charters
 Personal Affair (1953) as 4th Gossip (uncredited)
 The Million Pound Note (1954) as Mrs. Waldron-Smythe (uncredited)
 The Belles of St. Trinian's (1954) as Bilston School Mistress
 The Constant Husband (1955) as Friends and Relations - Gladys
 The Curse of Frankenstein (1957) as Aunt Sophia
 How to Murder a Rich Uncle (1957) as Aunt Marjorie
 High Flight (1957) as Tweedy Lady
 The Surgeon's Knife (1957) as Sister Slater
 Rx Murder (1958) as Lady Watson
 The Duke Wore Jeans (1958) as Lady Marguerite
 The Inn of the Sixth Happiness (1958) as Miss Thompson
 The Son of Robin Hood (1958) as Prioress
 Idol on Parade (1959) as School Mistress
 Bobbikins (1959) as Nurse
 Devil's Bait (1959) as Mrs. Davies
 Two Way Stretch (1960) as Miss Prescott
 The Angry Silence (1960) as Miss Bennett
 No Kidding (1960) as Vicar's wife
 Satan Never Sleeps (1962) as Sister Justine (uncredited) 
 Tamahine (1963) as Mrs. MacFarlane

Television
 Emergency – Ward 10 (1957–1967) as Mrs. Anderson
 Adventure story (1961)
 Oliver Twist (1962)
 From a Bird's Eye View (1970–1971) as Ms. Fosdyke

References

External links
 

1909 births
1979 deaths
British film actresses
British television actresses
20th-century British actresses
Actresses from Bristol